Zehtarabad (also Romanized as Zehtarābād; also known as Zaitarābād, Zaytarabad, and Zeytarābād) is a village in Gilvan Rural District, in the Central District of Tarom County, Zanjan Province, Iran. At the 2006 census, its population was 533, in 138 families.

References 

Populated places in Tarom County